John Mullen was a Major League Baseball player.

External links

Major League Baseball catchers
Philadelphia Athletics (NL) players
Baseball players from Pennsylvania
19th-century baseball players
Date of birth unknown